Edward William Peck  is vice-chancellor of Nottingham Trent University. Brought up in Skelmersdale, he was educated at Ormskirk Grammar School, and the University of Bristol, graduating with a degree in Philosophy in 1981. He subsequently undertook graduate studies at Bristol Polytechnic and the University of Nottingham focusing on Health Services Management and Social Policy.

Career 
Having commenced a career in management with the NHS, and serving in a number of senior posts, Peck switched to an academic career bringing his practical experience of the NHS to the analysis of health management policy. He gained a PhD from the University of Newcastle and in 1992 joined King's College London, becoming the Director of its Centre for Mental Health Services Development two years later. He became a leading figure in the closure of UK psychiatric asylums and the creation of community-based mental health care. Subsequently, from 2002–2008, Peck was Director of the Health Services Management Centre at the University of Birmingham.

In 2006, Peck moved on to senior management at the University of Birmingham, becoming the Head of the School of Public Policy and subsequently the Head of the newly formed College of Social Sciences in 2008, a role he held until becoming Vice-Chancellor of Nottingham Trent University (NTU) in August 2014.

Since then, NTU has been awarded The Times Higher Education University of the Year in 2017, The Sunday Times Modern University of the Year in 2018, and The Guardian University of the Year in 2019.

In 2018 he was invited by Theresa May to join the panel of the Post-18 Education Review of fees and funding of both HE and FE, more popularly referred to as the Augar Review, after its chair Philip Augar.  Peck is a Trustee of both the Universities and Colleges Employers Association (UCEA) and the Universities and Colleges Admissions Service (UCAS), where he is also Deputy Chair. He has been President of the Newark and Nottinghamshire Agricultural Society since 2020. He was until recently an elected member of the Board of Universities UK. He is a member of the Nottingham Growth Board, the Midlands Engine Board and the D2N2 Local Enterprise partnership.
In May 2022, the Department of Education appointed him as its first Student Support Champion.

Honours 
Peck is a Fellow of the Academy of Social Sciences. In July 2020 Peck was appointed Deputy Lieutenant of Nottinghamshire.

He was appointed Commander of the Order of the British Empire (CBE) in the 2021 New Year Honours for services to higher education.

Selected works 
Peck, E., (1995). The Performance of an NHS Trust Board: actor’s accounts, minutes and observation, British Journal of Management, 6, 2, 135-155.
 
Freeman, T. and Peck, E. (2007). Performing governance: a partnership board dramaturgy, Public Administration, 85, 4, 907-929.
 
Peck, E. and 6, P. (2006). Beyond Delivery: Policy Implementation as Sense-Making and Settlement, Houndsmills, Palgrave Macmillan

Peck, Edward and Helen Dickinson (2009) Performing Leadership Palgrave Macmillan, Basingstoke. 

Peck, Goodwin, Perri, and Freeman (2016)  Palgrave Macmillan,

References 

Living people
Academics of Nottingham Trent University
Year of birth missing (living people)
Commanders of the Order of the British Empire
People educated at Ormskirk Grammar School
National Health Service people
Alumni of the University of Bristol
Alumni of the University of Nottingham
Alumni of Newcastle University
British academic administrators